Hybomitra bimaculata is a Palearctic species of horse fly in the family Tabanidae.

Distribution
Europe, Russia, Mongolia, China, Japan.

References

External links
Images representing Hybomitra bimaculata
Martin C. Harvey , 2018 Key to genus Hybomitra

Tabanidae
Insects described in 1826
Diptera of Europe
Diptera of Asia
Taxa named by Pierre-Justin-Marie Macquart